Delirious Nomad is the second studio album by the American heavy metal band Armored Saint. It was released in 1985 via Chrysalis Records and recorded with producer Max Norman who previously worked for Ozzy Osbourne. While recording the album, guitarist Phil Sandoval left the band.

In 2011, Rock Candy released a remastered version of Delirious Nomad with two additional tracks.

Track listing

Personnel
Band members
John Bush – lead vocals, backing vocals
Dave Prichard – guitars
Joey Vera – bass, backing vocals
Gonzo Sandoval – drums, percussion

Additional musician
Phil Sandoval – first guitar solo on "Over the Edge" and additional rhythm guitar on "Aftermath"

Production
 Mixed at Record Plant and Can-Am Studios, Los Angeles, California
 Max Norman – producer, mixing
 Bill Freesh – engineer, mixing
 Matt Brady – engineer
 Michael J. Bowman – assistant engineer
 Bob Ludwig – mastering at Masterdisk
 Marty Capune – production management
 Ron Lafitte – tour manager
 Brockun, Q Prime Inc. – management
 Geffrey von Gerlach – art direction
 Ria Lewerke – art direction
 Armored Saint – cover concept
 Tom Murray – photography

References

External links 
Official band website
[ Armored Saint on Allmusic Guide]
Armored Saint's Delirious Nomad on Encyclopaedia Metallum

1985 albums
Chrysalis Records albums
Armored Saint albums
Albums produced by Max Norman